The Roman Catholic Diocese of Castanhal is a diocese located in the city of Castanhal in the Ecclesiastical province of Belém do Pará in Brazil.

History
 December 29, 2004: Established as Diocese of Castanhal from the Metropolitan Archdiocese of Belém do Pará and Diocese of Bragança do Pará

Leadership
 Bishops of Castanhal (Roman rite)
 Bishop Carlos Verzeletti (December 29, 2004 – present)

Sources

 GCatholic.org
 Catholic Hierarchy

Roman Catholic dioceses in Brazil
Christian organizations established in 2004
Castanhal, Roman Catholic Diocese of
Roman Catholic dioceses and prelatures established in the 21st century